G5 Sahel or G5S is an institutional framework for coordination of regional cooperation in development policies and security matters in west Africa. It was formed on 16 February 2014 in Nouakchott, Mauritania, at a summit of five Sahel  countries: Burkina Faso, Chad, Mali, Mauritania, and Niger. It adopted a convention of establishment on 19 December 2014, and is permanently seated in Mauritania. The coordination is organised on different levels. The military aspect is coordinated by the respective countries' Chiefs of Staff. The purpose of G5 Sahel is to strengthen the bond between economic development and security, and together battle the threat of jihadist organizations operating in the region (AQIM, MOJWA, Al-Mourabitoun, and Boko Haram).

History 
On 1 August 2014, France launched a counterterrorism mission, Operation Barkhane, deploying 3,000 soldiers in the member states of G5 Sahel. On 20 December, G5 Sahel, with the backing of the African Union, called on the United Nations Security Council to set up an international force to "neutralize armed groups, help national reconciliation, and establish stable democratic institutions in Libya." This was met with opposition from Algeria.

In June 2017, France requested that the United Nations Security Council approve the deployment of a counterterrorism task force consisting of 10,000 soldiers to G5 Sahel. The German Bundeswehr has agreed to contribute around 900 troops of its own to help the mission. They will mostly be utilized in the Gao region of Northern Mali for surveillance purposes. The European Union agreed to provide 50 million euros towards financing the force. Russia and China expressed support for the operation, while the United States and the United Kingdom did not agree about financing. France and the U.S. reached an agreement on 20 June 2017. The next day, the United Nations Security Council unanimously approved the deployment of a G5 Sahel counterterrorism task force. On 29 June, French Foreign Affairs Minister Jean-Yves Le Drian announced that the French military would cooperate with G5 Sahel.

Member states

See also 
 Pan Sahel Initiative

References

External links 
 
 West Africa: The G 5 Sahel - Survival in Time of COVID-19.

International organizations based in Africa
Intergovernmental organizations
Sahel